United Nations Security Council Resolution 2050 was unanimously adopted on 12 June 2012. It extends the UN's mandate to monitor nuclear, chemical and biological weapons possessed by North Korea, extending the mandate of the Panel of Experts.

See also 
List of United Nations Security Council Resolutions 2001 to 2100

References

External links
Text of the Resolution at undocs.org

2012 United Nations Security Council resolutions
2012 in North Korea
United Nations Security Council resolutions concerning North Korea
June 2012 events